Intensity is an album by American saxophonist and composer John Klemmer released on the Impulse! label.

Reception
The Allmusic review awarded the album 4 stars.

Track listing
All compositions by John Klemmer
 "Rapture of the Deep" - 9:20   
 "Love Song to Katherine" - 4:02   
 "Prayer for John Coltrane" - 1:46   
 "Waltz for John Coltrane" - 5:09   
 "(C'mon An') Play With Me" - 3:01   
 "Sea of Passion" - 5:49   
 "Last Summer's Spell" - 13:19   
Recorded at The Kabuki Theatre in San Francisco, California on, August 14, 1971 (tracks 6 & 7) and at The Village Recorder in Los Angeles, California on February 23, 1973 (tracks 1-5)

Personnel
John Klemmer - tenor saxophone, echoplex, pseudoechoplex, vocals, percussion
Tom Canning (tracks 1-5), Todd Cochran (Tracks 6 & 7) - electric piano
James Leary (tracks 6 & 7), Dave Parlato (tracks 1-5) - bass
Woody Theus - drums, percussion (tracks 6 & 7)
Victor Feldman - percussion (tracks 1-5)

References

Impulse! Records albums
John Klemmer albums
1973 albums